Bryan Appleyard  (born 24 August 1951, Manchester) is a British journalist and author.

Life and work
Appleyard was educated at Bolton School and King's College, Cambridge.  He worked at The Times and as a freelance journalist and has written for The New York Times, Vanity Fair, London's The Daily Telegraph, The Spectator and the New Statesman.

In 1992 he published the book Understanding the Present.

His 1996 novel is called  The First Church of the New Millennium. Appleyard has been selected as Feature Writer of the Year three times as well as Interviewer of the Year in the British Press Awards and he is a former fellow of the World Economic Forum.

Appleyard was appointed Commander of the Order of the British Empire (CBE) in the 2019 Birthday Honours for services to journalism and the arts.

Books 
 The Culture Club: Crisis in the Arts (1984) ( (pbk))
 Richard Rogers: A Biography (1986) ( (pbk))
 The Pleasures of Peace: Art and Imagination in Postwar Britain (1989)
 Understanding the Present: Science and the Soul of Modern Man (1992) ( (pbk))
 The First Church of the New Millennium: A Novel (1995)
 Brave New Worlds: Genetics and the Human Experience (1999)
 Aliens: Why They Are Here (2005)
 How to Live Forever or Die Trying (2007)
 The Brain is Wider Than the Sky: Why Simple Solutions Don't Work in a Complex World (2011)
 Bedford Park (2013)
 The Car: The Rise and Fall of the Machine that Made the Modern World (2022)

References

External links 
 
 Commentary on Appleyard's views on science in Life's Intrinsic Value: Science, Ethics, and Nature (2001) by Nicholas Agar (limited book preview at Archive.org) 
 Critique of Appleyard's Understanding the Present in Third Way, February 1993 (Google Books)
 

1951 births
English male journalists
Alumni of King's College, Cambridge
Living people
People from Bolton
The Times people
Writers from Manchester
People educated at Bolton School
Commanders of the Order of the British Empire